Drosophila acelidota is a species of fly in the genus Drosophila. It is found in Cameroon and the Republic of the Congo.

References 

acelidota
Insects described in 2004